Bivatuzumab mertansine is a combination of bivatuzumab, a humanized monoclonal antibody, and mertansine, a cytotoxic agent. It is designed for the treatment of squamous cell carcinoma.

References 

Monoclonal antibodies for tumors
Experimental cancer drugs
Antibody-drug conjugates